The Hotel del Ming is a historic hotel in Yuma, Arizona. It was built in 1926. The hotel was dedicated on December 20, 1926. It was designed in the Spanish Revival architectural style by Taylor & Taylor, two architects from Los Angeles, California. It has been listed on the National Register of Historic Places since December 7, 1982.

References

Buildings and structures in Yuma, Arizona
Hotel buildings completed in 1926
National Register of Historic Places in Yuma County, Arizona
Spanish Colonial Revival architecture in Arizona